Mexico competed at the 1952 Summer Olympics in Helsinki, Finland. 64 competitors, 61 men and 3 women took part in 35 events in 13 sports.

Medalists

Athletics

Men
Track & road events

Field events

Women
Field events

Basketball

Summary
{|class=wikitable style=font-size:90%;text-align:center
|-
!rowspan=2|Team
!rowspan=2|Event
!Preliminary round
!colspan=4|Group stage
!Quarterfinal
!Semifinal / 
!colspan=2|Final /  / 
|-style=font-size:95%
!OppositionResult
!OppositionResult
!OppositionResult
!OppositionResult
!Rank
!OppositionResult
!OppositionResult
!OppositionResult
!Rank
|-
|align=left|Mexico men's|align=left|Men's tournament
|
|W 66–48
|L 52–44
|L 71–62
|3
|colspan=4|did not advance
|}Team rosterGroup play'''

Boxing

Cycling

Road

Diving

Men

Women

Equestrian

Eventing

Jumping

Fencing

Men

Modern pentathlon

Shooting

Swimming

Water polo

Summary

Weightlifting

Wrestling

Freestyle

Wrestlers who accumulated 5 "bad points" were eliminated. Points were given as follows: 1 point for victories short of a fall and 3 points for every loss.

References

External links
Official Olympic Reports
International Olympic Committee results database

Nations at the 1952 Summer Olympics
1952
1952 in Mexican sports